Citadel Securities is an American market making firm headquartered in Miami. It is one of the largest market makers in the world, and is active in more than 50 countries. It is the largest designated market maker on the New York Stock Exchange. Citadel Securities is a separate entity from the hedge fund Citadel LLC, although both were founded and are majority owned by American financier Kenneth C. Griffin. Citadel Securities is expected to eventually move its headquarters from Chicago to Miami, having bought land there to build its new headquarters.

Overview

Market maker 
Citadel Securities was formed in 2002, and is a market maker, providing liquidity and trade execution to retail and institutional clients. Citadel Securities automation has resulted in more reliable trading at lower costs and with tighter spreads. In 2015, Barron's ranked Citadel Securities #1 in providing price improvement for investors in both S&P 500 and non-S&P shares.

Citadel Securities is the largest market maker in options in the U.S., executing about 25 percent of U.S.-listed equity options volume. According to the Wall Street Journal, about one-third of stock orders from individual investors is completed through Citadel, which accounts for about 10% of the firm's revenue. Citadel Securities also executes about 13 percent of U.S. consolidated volume in equities and 28 percent of U.S. retail equities volume. In 2014, Citadel Securities expanded its market-making offering to interest rate swaps, one of the most commonly traded derivatives. By 2015 Citadel Securities had become the world's largest interest-rate-swap trader by number of transactions replacing Wall Street banks.

During the coronavirus pandemic, Citadel Securities doubled its profit while generating $4 billion in revenue during the first half of 2020 due to an increase in volatility and retail trading.

In October 2020, Citadel Securities announced it would acquire the NYSE market making unit of rival IMC. The purchase made it the largest designated market maker (DMM) on the NYSE — overseeing over 1,500 NYSE-listed securities. , the firm oversaw more than 2,000 listed securities.

In October 2020, Citadel Securities filed a lawsuit against the Securities and Exchange Commission over the SEC's decision to approve a new "D-Limit" order type for IEX.

In August 2022, the firm continued its global expansion with a new office in Tokyo and announced plans to launch US fixed income offerings there.

The firm ended 2022 with its record revenue to date, topping its 2021 record and bringing in $7.5 billion.

Investment bank 
In 2008, Citadel Securities hired 70 people and Rohit D'Souza, a banker from Merrill Lynch, who left after eight months "to build an investment bank" and brokerage. By August 2011, Citadel ended its foray into investment banking to instead focus on electronic trading and market making.

Partnerships 
In 2009, Citadel Investment Group and the Chicago Mercantile Exchange partnered to create a credit default swaps electronic-trading platform.

In January 2022, Citadel Securities announced that venture capital firm Sequoia Capital and cryptocurrency investor Paradigm had made a $1.15 billion investment in the firm. The transaction valued Citadel Securities at approximately $22 billion.

Internship program 
Citadel Securities sponsors an 11-week summer internship program in which the interns learn about the company and its operations. In 2022 there were 290 interns in the program. Most were college seniors, and about half were software engineers, while the rest included quantitative researchers and traders.

Controversies

Concerns about conflicts of interest 
In light of Citadel Securities' role in the GameStop short squeeze event, individuals such as Senator Elizabeth Warren have raised concerns about several potential conflicts of interest. These include the relationship between Citadel Securities, which executes a majority of broker-dealer Robinhood's trades through a payment-for-order-flow relationship, and Citadel the asset manager, which provided a $2 billion investment in Melvin Capital, one of the main short sellers involved in the GameStop short squeeze. Because Ken Griffin, the CEO and majority shareholder of Citadel, was said to own 85% of Citadel Securities, there were concerns that the market maker's interests might align with the interests of those shorting GameStop to the detriment of those long GameStop. Griffin denied any wrongdoing. In November 2021, a U.S. District Court dismissed a class action lawsuit, ruling that investors failed to show collusion between Robinhood and Citadel.

In March 2021, Citadel's payment-for-order-flow arrangements with brokerages such as Robinhood was heavily criticized during Congressional hearings on the GameStop short squeeze.

Citadel's practice of hiring officials from agencies that regulate it, including the SEC and the CFTC, as well its relationships with Ben Bernanke and Janet Yellen, has also been widely observed and attracted concerns about conflicts of interest.

Concerns about systemic risk posed to U.S. markets 
Analysts of U.S. financial markets have been critical of the SEC's decision to exclude Citadel Securities from its 2014, Regulation Systems Compliance and Integrity (Reg SCI) regulatory regime designed to make U.S. securities markets safer for investors; both Citadel and the SEC declined to comment on Citadel's being exempted from complying with this rule.

In February 2021, House Financial Services chairwoman Maxine Waters suggested that the systematic importance of Citadel Securities might ultimately pose a threat to the U.S. financial system. This point also emerged on several occasions during the March 17, 2021, hearing by the House Financial Services, with experts observing that Citadel Securities claims to trade "approximately 26% of U.S. equities volume" and "executes approximately 47% of all U.S.-listed retail volume, and acts as a specialist or market-maker with respect to 99% of traded volume in 3,000 U.S.-listed options names."

In March 2021, President Biden's nominee for SEC Chairman, Gary Gensler, raised further concerns about Citadel's dominant market position in at a congressional hearing in March 2021, asking: "one firm now has 40% to 50% of the retail order flow, what does that do to pricing of capital in this country? What does it mean to be best execution in this context?" Invoking Amazon's dominance in the online retail marketplace, another market analyst described Citadel's rise as "the Amazonization of listed markets", a phenomenon he characterized as "very dangerous, not because there are no other players, but because over time it weakens the other players that could be competitive. It's the essence of concentration risk." On May 5, 2021, Gensler repeated these concerns in his testimony to the House of Representatives Financial Services Committee.

Regulatory issues 
Over a two-year period until September 2014, hundreds of thousands of large OTC orders were removed from its automated trading processes, rendering the orders "inactive" so that they had to be handled manually by human traders. Citadel Securities then "traded for its own account on the same side of the market at prices that would have satisfied the orders," without immediately filling the inactive orders at the same or better prices as required by FINRA rules.

In August 2014, Citadel was fined $800,000 for irregularities in its trading practices between March 18, 2010, and January 8, 2013.

In January 2017, Citadel was fined $22 million by the SEC for misleading clients regarding the way it priced trades.

In October 2018, Bloomberg reported that 40% of Robinhood's revenues were derived from selling customer orders to firms such as Citadel Securities and Two Sigma Securities.

In December 2018, Citadel was forced by the SEC to pay $3.5 million over violations stemming from incorrect reporting for nearly 80 million trades from 2012 to 2016.

In January 2020, Citadel paid a 670 million-yuan ($97 million) settlement for alleged trading irregularities dating from 2015.

Citadel Securities was fined $700,000 by FINRA in July 2020, for trading ahead of customer orders. They delayed certain equity orders from clients to buy or sell shares while continuing to trade the same stocks in its own account as part of its market-making activities, according to FINRA.

In 2020, Citadel Securities was censured by FINRA a total of 19 times for a variety of misconduct, including failing to close failure-to-deliver positions, naked short selling, inaccurate reporting of short sale indicators, executing trades during circuit-breaker halts, and failing to offer its clients best prices on the bid-ask spread.

In March 2021, Citadel agreed to a censure by FINRA and a $275,000 fine for improperly reporting nearly 500,000 Treasury transactions between 2017 and 2019, revealing a systemic failure in Citadel's compliance systems.

External links

References 

Financial services companies of the United States
Companies based in Miami
Financial services companies established in 2002
2002 establishments in Illinois